Norizam Ali Hassan (born 15 February 1976) is a Malaysian former footballer who played as striker. He formerly played with Malacca FA, as well as with Kedah FA, Terengganu FA and Perak FA.

Norizam once a winner of M-League golden with 13 goals in 2001. He retired after unsuccessful trials with others state and clubs.

Currently Norizam is the assistant head coach of Malacca FA, now renamed as Malacca United F.C., and owner of Kiddo Kickers Soccer Melaka.

References

Malaysian footballers
Perak F.C. players
1976 births
Living people
People from Malacca
Association football forwards